Brasiliscincus agilis is a species of skink found in Brazil.

References

Brasiliscincus
Reptiles of Brazil
Endemic fauna of Brazil
Reptiles described in 1823
Taxa named by Giuseppe Raddi